The El Paso Herald-Post was an afternoon daily newspaper in El Paso, Texas, USA.  It was the successor to the El Paso Herald, first published in 1881, and the El Paso Post, founded by the E. W. Scripps Company in 1922.  The papers merged in 1931 under Scripps ownership.

The Herald-Post was nominated for two Pulitzer Prizes in 1987 for a story about a Mexican drug lord and for its literacy campaign. It later launched the El Paso area's first online news site in 1996. When the Scripps-Howard newspaper chain shut the paper down in 1997, it cited a substantial decline in circulation, similar to that experienced by other afternoon newspapers in the U.S. at the time.

On August 24, 2015, a former local news employee revived the El Paso Herald-Post brand by launching a website with the same name. However, the online-only publication has no affiliation with the former newspaper.

External links
 "Texas' largest afternoon daily newspaper publishes final edition", Associated Press, October 11, 1997
El Paso Herald hosted by the Portal to Texas History.
El Paso Herald-Post homepage from 1996, hosted by the Internet Archive.

El Paso, Texas
Defunct newspapers published in Texas